Kabisthalam is a village under Papanasam taluk in Thanjavur district in Tamil Nadu. Tracing out the Vedic history Thiru Kavithalam was the original name for the place however the name changed into Kabisthalam during medieval ages. It is the birthplace of Indian National Congress leader G. K. Moopanar. 

Agriculture is the main occupation in this village. The main crops are rice, sugarcane, and vegetables. The village derives its name from the Gajendra Varadha Temple located in it. It is located in between Kallanai Poombhuhar state highway. Gajendra Varadha temple is one of the pilgrimage (38th Divyasthala).

References

District Development Authority, Thanjavur

Villages in Thanjavur district